Gronau may refer to:

Places
Gronau, North Rhine-Westphalia, a city in district Borken, North Rhine-Westphalia, Germany
Gronau (Westf) railway station
Gronau, Lower Saxony, a city on the river Leine in district Hildesheim, Lower Saxony, Germany
Gronau (Samtgemeinde), a Samtgemeinde ("collective municipality") in the district of Hildesheim, Lower Saxony, Germany
Groß Grönau, a municipality in the district of Lauenburg, Schleswig-Holstein, Germany
Gronau (Pinnau), a river of Schleswig-Holstein, Germany
Gronau (Sinn), a river of Hesse, Germany
Gronau Nunataks in Greenland

People with the surname
Ernst Gronau (1887–1938), German stage and film actor
Hans von Gronau (1850–1940), Prussian general
Jürgen Gronau (born 1962), German football player
Reuben Gronau (born 1937), Israeli American economist
Wolfgang von Gronau (1893–1977), German aviation pioneer